Benjamin Hicks was an American politician from New York.

Life
He was a Federalist member of the New York State Assembly, from Rensselaer Co. in 1792-93, 1794 and 1795; and from Otsego Co. in 1800-01.

Members of the New York State Assembly
New York (state) Federalists
People from Rensselaer County, New York
People from Otsego County, New York
Year of birth missing
Year of death missing